Craft production is manufacturing by hand, with or without the aid of tools. The term "craft production" describes manufacturing techniques that are used in handicraft trades. These were the common methods of manufacture in the pre-industrialized world.

Craft economy 
The craft manufacturing process results in a unique final product. While the product may be of extremely high quality, the uniqueness can be detrimental as seen in the case of early automobiles.

Womack, Jones and Roos in the book The Machine That Changed the World detailed that early automobiles were craft produced. Because each vehicle was unique, replacement parts had to be manufactured from scratch or at least customized to fit a specific vehicle. The advent of mass production and the standardized, interchangeable parts guaranteed a parts' compatibility with a variety of vehicle models.

Mass production has many drawbacks to craft production, including that production quality can be lower than a craft-produced item. For example, in some mass-production automobile manufacturing facilities, craftsmen rework flawed, mass-produced vehicles to give the appearance of a quality product.

Lean manufacturing aims to bring back or exceed the quality of craft production and remedy the inefficiency of mass production through the elimination of waste.

Craft production at the community scale 

Craft production is a part of the informal economy in many cities, such as Istanbul, Turkey where the informal craft economy is a vital source of income for the Turkish craftspeople. Craft markets are highly dependent on social interactions, and verbal training which results in variations in the goods produced. Often, the craft economy consists of craft neighbourhoods, by which a community is structured on the craft activity present in the area.

Often used in the household, many craft goods such as historic Mumun Pottery in Korea, originated from the need for economic alternatives to meet household needs. Changes in the craft economies have often coincided with changes in household organization, and social transformations, as in Korea in the Early to Middle Mumun Period.

Given that craft production requires an intimate knowledge of methods of production from an experienced individual of that craft, the connection between trades people is highly evident in craft communities. The production of many crafts have a high technical demand, and therefore require full-time specialization of the skill-set in the form of workshops, or verbal, hands-on training. The verbal interaction between teacher and student encourages strong social bonds, which ultimately leads to cohesive communities, typical of modern day craft communities.

Craft economies and location 
Craft economies are highly related to place. Craft-specialization explores how portable goods are integral to the social relations of a community, and links groups of people together through the creation of tangible items.

Places where craft economic activity is taking place indicate strong linkages between sociopolitical organization and societal complexity. These communities are often tight-knit, with strong linkages to materials produced and sold, as well as mutual respect for fellow tradesmen in the market place.

See also
 Artisan
 Batch production
 Craftsmanship
 Lean manufacturing
 Mass production
 Preorder economy
 Maker culture

References

Further reading
 

Production and manufacturing
Production